Susan Brady (born 2 March 1966) is a New Zealand actress who has made several appearances in different shows including Shortland Street, Marlin Bay, and Hercules: The Legendary Journeys. She is also a voice actress, with one of her more notable voice roles being the voice of the Mystic Mother in the 2006 finale of Power Rangers Mystic Force.

Filmography

External links

1966 births
Living people
New Zealand television actresses
New Zealand film actresses